The digital switchover is the process by which analogue terrestrial television in the United Kingdom was replaced with digital terrestrial television. It is sometimes referred to as the "analogue switch off".

In the United Kingdom, the terrestrial switchover started on 17 October 2007 and was completed on 24 October 2012. Each group of transmitters within each TV region had its analogue broadcasts switched off at a certain point between those dates. The process was co-ordinated by an independent body, Digital UK.

Switchover guide
Stage 1 – Known as DSO1 - Analogue BBC Two and low power digital Multiplex 1 switched off. High power Multiplex 1 switched on.
Stage 2 – Known as DSO2 - All remaining analogue channels and low power digital multiplexes switched off. Remaining high power digital multiplexes switched on.

Switchover dates
These are the dates at which switchover took place in each TV region, as published by Digital UK.

Technical trial

Border

Westcountry

HTV Wales

Granada

HTV West

STV North (Grampian)

Channel Islands

The Channel Islands' transmitters carry three of the DTT multiplexes – BBCA, D3&4 and BBCB. BBCA carries the BBC's SD channels as elsewhere, the D3&4 mux carries ITVBe (which is on the SDN mux elsewhere) as of September 2022 in place of ITV1 +1 (which is not available on the islands), and BBCB carries BBC HD, BBC One HD and Channel 4 HD (ITV Channel Television does not broadcast an HD version of their services).

Due to close proximity to France, a multi-stage switchover was deemed impossible. Instead, the switchover was done in a single day. As such, all analogue signals were switched off at around 01:30, while digital signals were switched on at Frémont Point before 06:00 and at its relay transmitters before 15:00.

STV Central

Anglia

Central

Yorkshire

Meridian

London

Tyne Tees

UTV

Northern Ireland completed the digital switchover on the same day as the Republic of Ireland, with Northern Ireland switching off analogue transmissions shortly before midnight, and the Republic of Ireland shortly after 10am. Viewers in some areas are able to receive an additional multiplex of channels carrying RTÉ One, RTÉ2 and TG4. These are broadcast in DVB-T2, and despite not being in high definition, require a Freeview HD receiver. Viewers in much of Northern Ireland can receive these and other Irish channels directly from Saorview transmitters based in the Republic. As these are broadcast in MPEG4, a Freeview HD receiver is generally required, although a very small number of standard Freeview receivers are compatible. Almost all viewers in Northern Ireland are able to receive at least some channels from the Republic by one or both of these means.

See also
Digital terrestrial television in the United Kingdom
Digital changeover dates in New Zealand

References

External links 
Digital UK
Digital Switchover UK

Switchover
2008 in British television
2009 in British television
2010 in British television
2011 in British television
2012 in British television